Naucelle is a commune in the Aveyron department in southern France. Naucelle station has rail connections to Toulouse, Albi and Rodez.

Population

Personalities
Ozil de Cadartz, medieval troubadour
Marcellin Cazals, Resistance fighter
Jean Cuq, the general was from Naucelle.

See also
Communes of the Aveyron department

References

Communes of Aveyron